The Dreamtime at the 'G is an annual Australian rules football match between Australian Football League clubs  and .

Since the 2007 season the match has been held annually on the Saturday night of the AFL's "Indigenous Round", also known as the Sir Doug Nicholls Round. The name of the match comes from the Australian Aboriginal term "Dreamtime" and "the 'G", a nickname for the Melbourne Cricket Ground (MCG) where the match usually takes place; it has been played away from the ground on two occasions, when the COVID-19 pandemic impacted football in Victoria.

The game draws one of the highest crowds of the home-and-away season, with an average crowd of over 70,000 since its inception (with the exception of rain-affected matches), and a record attendance of 85,656 in 2017. The winning club is awarded the "Kevin Sheedy Cup", and the best player on the ground is awarded the "Yiooken Award".

History
Dreamtime at the 'G was first held in 2005, with the aim being to recognise the contribution of all Indigenous players to the AFL.  It was held during NAIDOC Week.

From 2006, the Yiooken Award has been awarded to the player judged best on ground in the match.

In 2007, following the success of the match in 2005 and 2006, the AFL nominated a specific Indigenous Round (round 9), which has become an annual event in which the Dreamtime at the 'G match takes centre stage. The success of the annual match, which now usually features crowds in excess of 80,000, led to the two clubs agreeing to cement the match's official status for an additional decade in May 2016.

From 2016, the Indigenous Round was named after Sir Doug Nicholls, the only AFL player to have been knighted and the only Aboriginal person or AFL player to serve as a state governor. Each year, each player in all 18 clubs wears a specially-commissioned artwork by an Indigenous artist on their guernsey. In 2019, former Essendon player Michael Long was honoured during this round.

In 2020, the match was played at TIO Stadium in Darwin, as it was not possible for the match to be played in Melbourne due to the city being locked down during the ongoing COVID-19 pandemic. In 2021, another COVID-19 lockdown in Victoria led to the AFL moving the fixture to Optus Stadium in Perth.

Notable matches
Round 6, 2006, saw Richmond escape with a two-point victory over Essendon after Jarrad Oakley-Nicholls scored the match-winning behind with minutes remaining in the final quarter.
Round 9, 2007: With just under five minutes remaining, Richmond had a 12-point lead, which was pulled back by Essendon to level the match at 84-apiece; the score was Richmond 12.12.(84) – Essendon 11.18.(84). Tigers full-forward Matthew Richardson thought he had kicked the match-winning goal, but a  subsequent fifty-metre penalty was awarded after Richardson had pushed his opponent in the back prior to kicking the goal. Essendon kicked the last 1.2.(8) of the match to win the game by eight points and deny Richmond what would have been their first win of the 2007 season.
Round 13, 2020, was notable due to the unique circumstances under which the game took place as a result of the stage four COVID-19 pandemic lockdowns in Melbourne which prevented the match from being played at the Melbourne Cricket Ground. The match was played at Marrara Oval in Darwin, with Richmond winning by twelve points. Shai Bolton, who designed the guernsey the Richmond players wore in this match, won the Yiooken Medal for his best-on-ground performance.
Similar to the year before, the Round 12, 2021, match saw a relocation of the match from Melbourne due to a COVID-19 lockdown, this time to Optus Stadium in Perth. Despite losing the match by 39 points, Essendon player Darcy Parish won the Yiooken Medal for his record-breaking performance of 44 disposals. It was the most disposals in one match ever recorded by an Essendon player.

The Long Walk

The match is associated with the pre-game commemoration events organised by The Long Walk, a charity inspired by Indigenous former Essendon player Michael Long, who walked halfway from Melbourne to Canberra in 2004 to get the lives of Aboriginal and Torres Strait Islander people back on the national agenda. He halted his walk after then Prime Minister John Howard agreed to talk to him.

On the day of the Dreamtime match, The Long Walk holds a community celebration featuring entertainment and activities as well as community organisation information stalls. Prior to the Dreamtime match, Long and several thousand other participants walk from Federation Square to the Melbourne Cricket Ground to promote reconciliation. In 2013, over 15,000 participants walked to the MCG. The walk has grown in stature and size, and in 2016 was attended by Prime Minister Malcolm Turnbull and the Leader of the Opposition, Bill Shorten.

Curtain raisers

A curtain raiser match is sometimes held between two Indigenous football teams from around Australia and its territories.

Pre-match ceremony

Each year, the game is preceded by an extravagant indigenous-based music and entertainment show. Performers in 2008, for example, included Paul Kelly and Kev Carmody.

Match results

|- style=";background:#ccf"
| 
| Year
| Date
| 
| Home Team
| 
| Away Team
| 
| Ground
| Crowd
| Winner
|
|
|
| Yiooken Award Winner 
| Report
|- style="background:#fff;"
| 1
| style="text-align: center;"|2005
| 9/7
| 15
|style="background:#ccffcc;"|Richmond
|style="background:#ccffcc;"|14.8 (92)
| Essendon
| 9.12 (66)
| Melbourne Cricket Ground
| 49,975
|bgcolor="Black" div style="text-align: center;"|
!26
!W
|bgcolor="Black" div style="text-align: center;"|
| Not awarded
| –
|- style="background:#fff;"
| 2
| style="text-align: center;"|2006
| 6/5
| 6
| Essendon
| 13.17 (95)
|style="background:#ccffcc;"|Richmond
|style="background:#ccffcc;"|13.19 (97)
| Melbourne Cricket Ground
| 58,439
|bgcolor="Black" div style="text-align: center;"|
!2
!L
|bgcolor="Black" div style="text-align: center;"|
| Dean Polo
| 
|- style="background:#fff;"
| 3
| style="text-align: center;"|2007
|26/5
|9
| Richmond
| 12.12 (84)
|style="background:#ccffcc;"|Essendon
|style="background:#ccffcc;"|12.20 (92)
| Melbourne Cricket Ground
| 61,837
|bgcolor="Black" div style="text-align: center;"|
!8
!L
|bgcolor="Black" div style="text-align: center;"|
| James Hird
| 
|- style="background:#fff;"
| 4
| style="text-align: center;"|2008
|24/5
|9
|Essendon
|10.12 (72)
|style="background:#ccffcc;"| Richmond
|style="background:#ccffcc;"| 16.14 (110)
|Melbourne Cricket Ground
|60,333
|bgcolor="Black" div style="text-align: center;"|
!38
!L
|bgcolor="Black" div style="text-align: center;"|
| Nathan Foley
| 
|- style="background:#fff;"
| 5
| style="text-align: center;"|2009
|23/5
|9
|Richmond
|12.13 (85)
|style="background:#ccffcc;"|Essendon
|style="background:#ccffcc;"|19.11 (125)
|Melbourne Cricket Ground
|73,625
|bgcolor="Black" div style="text-align: center;"|
!40
!L
|bgcolor="Black" div style="text-align: center;"|
| Jason Winderlich
| 
|- style="background:#fff;"
| 6
| style="text-align: center;"|2010
|23/5
|9
|style="background:#ccffcc;"|Essendon
|style="background:#ccffcc;"|19.16 (130)
|Richmond
|14.11 (95)
|Melbourne Cricket Ground
|64,709
|bgcolor="Black" div style="text-align: center;"|
!35
!W
|div style="text-align: center;"|0
| David Hille
| 
|- style="background:#fff;"
| 7
| style="text-align: center;"|2011
| 21/5
| 9
|style="background:#ccffcc;"|Richmond
|style="background:#ccffcc;"|16.9 (105)
| Essendon
| 13.11 (89)
| Melbourne Cricket Ground
| 83,563
|bgcolor="Black" div style="text-align: center;"|
!16
!W
|bgcolor="Black" div style="text-align: center;"|
| Trent Cotchin
| 
|- style="background:#fff;"
| 8
| style="text-align: center;"|2012
|19/5
|8
|style="background:#ccffcc;"|Essendon
|style="background:#ccffcc;"|19.14 (128)
|Richmond
|15.19 (109)
|Melbourne Cricket Ground
|80,900
|bgcolor="Black" div style="text-align: center;"|
!19
!W
|div style="text-align: center;"|0
| Brett Deledio
| 
|- style="background:#fff;"
| 9
| style="text-align: center;"|2013
|25/5
|9
|Richmond
|9.8 (62)
|style="background:#ccffcc;"|Essendon
|style="background:#ccffcc;"|13.13 (91)
|Melbourne Cricket Ground
|84,234
|bgcolor="Black" div style="text-align: center;"|
!29
!L
|bgcolor="Black" div style="text-align: center;"|
| Jobe Watson
| 
|- style="background:#fff;"
| 10
| style="text-align: center;"|2014
|31/5
|11
|style="background:#ccffcc;"|Essendon
|style="background:#ccffcc;"|15.14 (104)
|Richmond
|7.12 (54)
|Melbourne Cricket Ground
|74,664
|bgcolor="Black" div style="text-align: center;"|
!50
!W
|bgcolor="Black" div style="text-align: center;"|
| Brendon Goddard
| 
|- style="background:#fff;"
| 11
| style="text-align: center;"|2015
|30/5
|9
|style="background:#ccffcc;"|Richmond
|style="background:#ccffcc;"|10.12 (72)
|Essendon
|8.11 (59)
|Melbourne Cricket Ground
|83,804
|bgcolor="Black" div style="text-align: center;"|
!13
!W
|bgcolor="Black" div style="text-align: center;"|
| Brandon Ellis
| 
|- style="background:#fff;"
| 12
| style="text-align: center;"|2016
|28/5
|10
|Essendon
|10.7 (67)
|style="background:#ccffcc;"| Richmond
|style="background:#ccffcc;"| 16.9 (105)
|Melbourne Cricket Ground
|56,948
|bgcolor="Black" div style="text-align: center;"|
!38
!L
|div style="text-align: center;"|0
| Dustin Martin
| 
|- style="background:#fff;"
| 13
| style="text-align: center;"|2017
|27/5
|10
|style="background:#ccffcc;"|Richmond
|style="background:#ccffcc;"|11.15 (81)
|Essendon
|10.6 (66)
|Melbourne Cricket Ground
|85,656
|bgcolor="Black" div style="text-align: center;"|
!15
!W
|bgcolor="Black" div style="text-align: center;"|
| Dustin Martin
| 
|- style="background:#fff;"
| 14
| style="text-align: center;"|2018
|2/6
|11
|Essendon
|6.7 (43)
|style="background:#ccffcc;"| Richmond
|style="background:#ccffcc;"| 17.12 (114)
|Melbourne Cricket Ground
|81,046
|bgcolor="Black" div style="text-align: center;"|
!71
!L
|bgcolor="Black" div style="text-align: center;"|
| Shane Edwards
| 
|- style="background:#fff;"
| 15
| style="text-align: center;"|2019
|25/5
|10
|style="background:#ccffcc;"|Richmond
|style="background:#ccffcc;"|10.13 (73)
|Essendon
|6.14 (50)
|Melbourne Cricket Ground
|80,176
|bgcolor="Black" div style="text-align: center;"|
!23
!W
|bgcolor="Black" div style="text-align: center;"|
| Bachar Houli
| 
|- style="background:#fff;"
| 16
| style="text-align: center;"|2020
|22/8
|13
|Essendon
|10.1 (61)
|style="background:#ccffcc;"| Richmond
|style="background:#ccffcc;"| 10.13 (73)
|TIO Stadium
|5,401
|bgcolor="Black" div style="text-align: center;"|
!12
!L
|bgcolor="Black" div style="text-align: center;"|
| Shai Bolton
| 
|- style="background:#fff;"
| 17
| style="text-align: center;"|2021
|5/6
|12
|Essendon
|12.12 (84)
|style="background:#ccffcc;"| Richmond
|style="background:#ccffcc;"| 19.9 (123)
|Optus Stadium
|55,656
|bgcolor="Black" div style="text-align: center;"|
!39
!L
|bgcolor="Black" div style="text-align: center;"|
| Darcy Parish
| 
|- style="background:#fff;"
| 18
| style="text-align: center;"|2022
|21/5
|10
|style="background:#ccffcc;"|Richmond
|style="background:#ccffcc;"|11.14 (80)
|Essendon
|7.6 (48)
|Melbourne Cricket Ground
|70,226
|bgcolor="Black" div style="text-align: center;"|
!32
!W
|bgcolor="Black" div style="text-align: center;"|
| Dion Prestia
|

Kevin Sheedy Cup

In 2005, Richmond and Essendon first competed for the Kevin Sheedy Cup. The cup has continued to be awarded to the winner of each Dreamtime at the 'G game.

Sheedy has a strong connection with both Essendon and Richmond, having played 251 games for Richmond, including their 1969, 1973 and 1974 premiership teams. He won the 1976 best & fairest award, captained the club in 1978, was named on their Team of the Century at left back-pocket and inducted into the Richmond Hall of Fame in 2002. He retired in 1979. He then went on to coach Essendon from 1981 to 2007, amassing 635 games as coach and led the club to premierships in 1984, 1985, 1993 & 2000. He was named as coach of the Essendon Team of the Century. He was a selector for the Indigenous Team of the Century and has championed indigenous football, reconciliation, and education.

See also

 Indigenous Team of the Century
 Indigenous All-Stars (Australian rules football)
List of individual match awards in the Australian Football League

Notes

References

Australian Football League games
Australian rules football culture
Essendon Football Club
Indigenous Australian sport
Richmond Football Club
Sport in Melbourne